Forged by Fire is the third full-length album by Greek power metal band Firewind and their first released through Century Media. From this album onwards, Gus G is the sole ever-present in their professional discography, following the replacement of Stephen Fredrick with Chitral "Chity" Somapala. It is also the first album to feature keyboardist Bob Katsionis.

Track listing
All tracks composed by Gus G. and Chitral Somapala except where noted
"Kill to Live"  – 3:41
"Beware the Beast"  – 4:21
"Tyranny"  – 3:29
"The Forgotten Memory"  – 3:42
"Hate World Hero"  – 5:38
"Escape from Tomorrow"  – 3:51
"Feast of the Savages" (Instrumental) (Gus G.) – 4:21
"Burn in Hell"  – 4:38
"Perished in Flames"  – 4:52
"The Land of Eternity"  – 5:53
"I Confide" – 5:05 (Japanese bonus track)
"Tyranny" (Ioannis Nikolaidis, Achilleas Kapahtsis) (Video clip)
"Making of/Burning the Earth Live" (Bob Katsionis) (Video clip)

Personnel
Band members
 Chitral "Chity" Somapala – vocals, backing vocals
 Gus G. – guitars, producing, engineering
 Bob Katsionis – keyboards, album layout
 Petros Christo – bass guitar
 Stian L. Kristoffersen – drums
Guest musicians
James Murphy – guitar solo on "The Forgotten Memory"
Marty Friedman – guitar solos "Feast of the Savages"
Lisa Gelenberg – backing vocals
Johannes Nimtz – backing vocals
Markus Teske – backing vocals
Technical staff
Patrik J. Sten – mixing
Fredrik Nordström – assistance
Christian Schmidt – mastering
R.D. Liapakis – mastering
Markus Teske – engineering
Espen Mjoen – engineering
Kazuo Hakamada – artwork
OB Solutions – photography

Footnotes

Firewind albums
Century Media Records albums
2005 albums